Thomas Bromwich may refer to:

 Thomas John I'Anson Bromwich (1875–1929), English mathematician
Thomas Bromwich (MP), English politician